Bodovlje (or Wodoule) is a village in the Municipality of Škofja Loka in the Upper Carniola region of Slovenia.

Geography

Bodovlje is a clustered village that lies on the right bank of the Poljane Sora River, along both sides of Bodovlje Creek. Most of the settlement is on the floodplain along the river, but some houses also stand in the narrow valley along the creek. The creek valley is bounded by Dešna Hill (elevation ) to the east and Saint Peter's Hill (elevation ) to the southwest. There are fields and meadows in the flat area along the river, and the creek valley and hillsides are forested.

Name
Bodovlje was attested in written records in 1291 and 1318 as Vondeul (and as Wodobli in 1500). The name is presumably derived from the plural demonym *Bǫdovľane, created from a place name such as *Bǫdovľe (selo) (literally, 'Bǫdъ's village'), based on the personal name *Bǫdь or *Bǫdъ. An alternate, but less likely, theory is that the name is derived from *ǫdolьje 'valleys' via prothesis and the phonological development v > b, known as betacizem in Slovene (i.e., *ǫd- > *vǫd- > *bǫd-). In the past, the settlement was known as Wodovlje or Wodoule in German.

History

Mass grave
Bodovlje is the site of a mass grave from the period immediately after the Second World War. The Bodovlje Mass Grave is located on a steep forest slope 200 m southeast of the village. It contains the remains of 22 to 24 Home Guard prisoners of war that were taken from the prison at Loka Castle on the night of 29 May 1945, murdered, and buried in a former Partisan bunker.

Post–World War II
The Termika factory was established in Bodovlje in 1958. It produced mineral wool and employed about 220 people. The site of the plant was formerly a veneer factory.

Church

The local church is dedicated to Saint Peter. It dates to the early 16th century, although the nave was vaulted in the Baroque style at a later date. The nave contains remains of frescos from the early 16th century. The sanctuary is also decorated with saints in the lower borders, apostles at window height, and evangelists and angels higher up, all by the painter Jernej of Loka dating to between 1525 and 1540. The church altars date to the 18th century.

References

External links 

Bodovlje at Geopedia

Populated places in the Municipality of Škofja Loka